"Clubhouses" is the twelfth episode of the second season of the American animated television series South Park. The 25th episode of the series overall, it originally aired on Comedy Central in the United States on September 23, 1998. The episode was written by series co-creator Trey Parker, along with Nancy M. Pimental, and directed by Parker. In the episode, the boys set out to build clubhouses so they can play Truth or Dare with girls, while Randy and Sharon Marsh's marriage begins to fall apart.

Plot
Stan and Kyle set out to build a clubhouse so they can play Truth or Dare with Wendy and Bebe. Stan believes he will be dared to kiss his girlfriend, Wendy, and Bebe, who has developed a crush on Kyle, plans to dare Kyle to kiss her. Cartman and Kenny learn of Stan and Kyle's plans and set about building their own clubhouse.

Meanwhile, Stan's parents, Randy and Sharon, divorce due to constant bickering. Sharon soon introduces Stan to a new stepfather, Roy, who promptly moves into the family home. Cartman and Kenny complete their clubhouse first, and Kenny manages to get two 16-year-old girls to hang out with them. Cartman attempts to get the girls to play Truth or Dare, but this fails when one of the girls says that Truth or Dare is for children. They instead instigate a massive party in the clubhouse, during which Kenny is inadvertently crushed. Stan and Kyle eventually finish their clubhouse, but it is time for Stan to visit his father. Randy displays insincere interest and is more focused on enjoying single life. The girls visit Stan and Kyle's clubhouse to play Truth or Dare. Kyle and Bebe end up kissing, and before Stan has his turn, Roy interrupts, causing Wendy and Bebe to leave.

Randy and Sharon get back together as Stan sets them up for a meeting in his clubhouse. The next day, Stan and Clyde play Truth or Dare with Wendy and Bebe. Stan asks for a dare, expecting to be asked to kiss Wendy, but is instead told to insert a stick in his urethra ("jam it" up his "peehole").

Cultural references
The Fat Abbott Show is a parody of 
Fat Albert and the Cosby Kids.

One of the teenage girls Cartman invites to his clubhouse is wearing a shirt with "D.V.D.A." (Double Vaginal Double Anal) printed on it, a reference to Stone and Parker's comedy band.

Home media
All 18 episodes of the second season, including "Clubhouses", were released on a DVD box set on June 3, 2003.

References

External links

 "Clubhouses" Full Episode at South Park Studios
 

1998 American television episodes
Cultural depictions of Bill Cosby
South Park (season 2) episodes
Television episodes about divorce